Mi Ridell (Mi Ingrid Marie Pettersson) (born 3 June 1968 in Karlskrona) is a Swedish actress and singer.

Ridell was a celebrity dancer on Let's Dance in 2008, broadcast on TV4.

Selected filmography 
Oumi (2004) (TV)

References

External links 

Swedish television actresses
1968 births
Living people
Swedish women singers
21st-century Swedish actresses
People from Karlskrona